The Office of the Commissioner for Public Appointments in Scotland (OCPAS) regulates and monitors the way in which ministerial appointments are made to the boards of public bodies in Scotland. The Office was founded in 2004, and is headed by the Commissioner, currently Bill Thomson.

History

OCPAS was created by the Public Appointments and Public Bodies etc (Scotland) Act 2003.

On 1 June 2004 Karen Carlton was appointed as the first Commissioner for Public Appointments in Scotland. In 2012 Stuart Allan became acting Commissioner and then the Commissioner for Ethical Standards in July 2013, with the new role . Bill Thomson was appointed as Commissioner in April 2014.

Role

The Role of OCPAS is to regulate the process by which people are appointed to the boards of many of the public bodies operating in Scotland such as the Royal Botanic Gardens Edinburgh.

Appointments to these bodies are made by Scottish Ministers, who rely on a team of people to identify and recommend to them suitable candidates for appointment. The process is administered by the Scottish Government and closely monitored by representatives of the Commissioner. These representatives are called OCPAS Assessors. An OCPAS Assessor is actively involved at each stage of every appointment regulated by OCPAS; they act as a member of the team that recommends suitable candidates for appointment. The process followed by the team is open and transparent. It ensures that only people with appropriate skills, knowledge and personal qualities are recommended to Ministers. All vacancies are publicised and people who wish to be considered must submit an application and be assessed against the skills, knowledge and personal qualities required for the role. Every application is handled in the same way, to ensure equality of opportunity and treatment. 
 
In 2006 OCPAS published a Code of Practice for Ministerial Appointments to Public Bodies in Scotland which sets out the principles and practices the Commissioner expects the Scottish Government to adopt.

The Commissioner is responsible for reporting breaches of the Code of Practice to the Scottish Ministers. The Commissioner also has the power to direct the Scottish Ministers to delay making appointments where the Code of Practice has been breached, and refer the matter to the Scottish Parliament.

References

External links

 Commissioner for Ethical Standards in Public Life in Scotland

 Office of the Commissioner for Public Appointments in Scotland
Ombudsmen in Scotland
Scottish commissions and inquiries
Scottish Parliamentary Corporate Body
2004 establishments in Scotland
Government agencies established in 2004